Devil's Peak Brewing Company is a South African brewery located at the base of the famous Devils Peak mountain in Cape Town, South Africa.

Original Range

Founders Series

The Kings Blockhouse IPA
The Kings Blockhouse IPA, named after a military blockhouse on Devils Peak, is the flagship IPA from Devils Peak Brewing Company. It is a hoppy and bitter, moderately strong, American India pale ale.

It is "rated as the best beer in South Africa" according to rankings on ratebeer.com. It also won “best beer on show” at the 2011, 2012 and 2014 Cape Town Festival of Beer and the 2014 Johannesburg Festival of Beer and was the winner of the 2014 SAB Craft Brewer Championship.

First Light Golden Ale
First Light Golden Ale is described as an “easy drinking” session ale. Significantly less bitter than the flagship Blockhouse IPA, the brewery regards this ale as a good introduction to craft beer.

It was named because the eastern-facing slopes of Devils Peak are amongst the first to see the early morning sunlight in Cape Town.

Woodhead Amber Ale
The Woodhead Amber Ale is a take on the red ales of the United States' Pacific Northwest and has a slightly hoppier finish compared with other South African examples of this style.

Its name was derived from the Woodhead Dam, one of the five dams built on Table Mountain at the turn of the 20th century to supply water to Cape Town. The Woodhead Dam was designated as an International Historic Civil Engineering Landmark by the American Society of Civil Engineers in 2008.

Silvertree Saisson
The Silvertree Saison is a moderately bitter farmhouse ale brewed in the traditional style. It is often used as the base for many of the barrel aged specialty beers produced at the brewery.

Silvertree was named after the endangered Silvertrees (Leucadendron argenteum), which are endemic to a small area of the Cape Peninsula, in and around the city of Cape Town, South Africa. The Silver Tree is a protected tree in South Africa and still grows wild on the slopes of Devil's Peak.

Explorer Series

English Ale 
With a slightly lower alcohol level, the Devils Peak English Ale is a well-balanced, a take on the 'Special' bitters found in England. It's designed to be a sessionable beer with lower levels of bitterness.

American Pale Ale 
Based on the American West Coast Pale Ale, this brew uses American hops to give it a strong hop presence while a lower alcohol level ensures it's a good session pale ale.

Black IPA 
Black IPAs are still a fairly new style of beer, generally regarded as showcasing slight malt with light to medium roast notes and a similar level of hoppy as standard American IPA's. They are often also referred to as India Dark Ales, India Black Ales, Cascadian Dark Ales, Dark IPAs, or India Brown Ales.

Imperial IPA 
Based on an American Imperial India Pale Ale, this is an exceptionally hop forward beer with a strong flavor and higher alcohol.

Specialty Series

Vannie Hout
Vannie Hout is a Brett-infused, barrel-aged, farmhouse ale. It is kept for six months in Chardonnay and Pinot Noir wine barrels, imparting the unique character of the wood and some of the flavor of previous contents.

Vin de Saisson 
Vin de Saisson is a beer and wine hybrid, which uses grape must (juice) during the brewing process. The regular Vin de Saisson Devils Peak incorporates 20% Chenin Blanc into the brewing process, imparting a super fresh aroma and crisp grape derived acidity.

See also
 Beer in South Africa
 Microbrewery
 Barrel-aged beer

External links
 Devils Peak Brewing Company website
 ratebeer.com
 beeradvocate.com
 craftbeer.com

References

Breweries of South Africa
Food and drink companies based in Cape Town
Manufacturing companies based in Cape Town
South African brands
Food and drink companies established in 2012